Buzay Abbey, dedicated to Our Lady, was a Cistercian Abbey at Rouans in Pays de la Loire, France, formerly in Brittany, founded in 1135 and dissolved in 1790.

History

Bernard of Clairvaux founded the abbey at Buzay in 1135, at the request of Ermengarde of Anjou, widow of Alan IV, Duke of Brittany, and mother of Conan III, Duke of Brittany. The next year, in 1136, the first community of a dozen monks settled on the site of the new abbey with Nivard, a younger brother of Bernard de Clairvaux, as their prior. Bernard himself came for the dedication of the new foundation, accompanied by Geoffroy de Lèves, Bishop of Chartres, as they were travelling together on a visit to Parthenay to meet William X, Duke of Aquitaine.
Around 1143, Bernard of Clairvaux came from Champagne to visit Buzay, but found its abbey in a state of great poverty and neglect. Conan III had not honoured his promises of support, and Bernard asked the monks to return to Clairvaux, but first he met Conan III, who admitted his fault and gave the monks everything he had denied them. They then decided to stay.

The abbey became rich, thanks to the salt trade, commercial traffic on the river Loire, and many gifts of land and other property. In 1177, Robert II, bishop of Nantes, approved the addition of a convent for nuns. In 1180, Geoffrey Plantagenet, Count of Nantes, a son of Henry II of England, Duke of Normandy, and of Eleanor of Aquitaine, assigned to the abbey in perpetuity twenty livres to be paid by the mills of the surrounding parish.
With effect from 1474, commendatory abbots were appointed by the duke or king, replacing the regular abbots elected locally.

During the War in the Vendée (March – December 1793), following the French Revolution, Buzay Abbey was destroyed by fire. What now remains of the buildings is a tower which had been rebuilt in the 18th century, and some vaulted cellars. Other survivals are the bells, which were transferred to Chartres cathedral, an Italian marble altar, which was moved to the church of Saint-Louis in Paimbœuf, a pulpit, now in the church of St Peter in Bouguenais, and some other objects, including the oldest crucifix in the Pays de Retz, dating from the fourteenth century, in the chapel of St Anne of Tharon at Saint-Michel-Chef-Chef.

Daughter houses 

From Buzay, three new Cistercian abbeys were instituted as daughter houses.

On 1 July 1172, Buzay sent a few monks to the small Île du Pilier, north of Noirmoutier. However, the small windswept island posed so many problems for the new community that in 1205 the monks fell back on the island of Noirmoutier and founded the abbey of Our Lady the White.

On 25 March 1200, at the request of Constance, Duchess of Brittany, monks were sent for the founding of her new Villeneuve Abbey, on land belonging to Buzay, located on the Ognon, a river flowing into the lake of Grand-Lieu, near the Châtellenie of Touffou and the village of Bignon. The monks would help to drain the surrounding marshes, with advice from engineers of the Poitevin marshes, and would also help to dig a canal between Messan and the Loire.

In 1259, Buzay was prosperous enough to establish Prières Abbey, at the request of John I, Duke of Brittany, and the Cistercian Order.

List of Abbots

Regular
 1144 : Pierre I
 1150–1153 : Guillaume I
 1155 : Adam
 1170 : Pierre II
 1175 : Geoffroi
 1177 : Richard
 1187 : Menno
 1199 : Guillaume II Robert
 1203 : Gaultier
 1206 : Égide I
 1206 : Raoul
 1232 : Richard II
 1236 : Mathieu
 1237 : Barthélemy
 1244 : Égide II
 1268 : Robert
 1270 : Samson
 1276 : Daniel
 1310 : Henri I
 1317 : Jean I
 1325 : Jean II de Mez
 1359 : Henri II
 1377 : Louis
 1384 : Guillaume III Maréchal
 1417 : Jean III Gendron
 1453 : Pierre Villageys
 1454–1471 : Humbert Boulay

Commendatory
 1474–1492 : Odet de la Rivière
 1492 : Pierre III Gigan
 1494–1512 : Jean IV Bohier
 1519 : Jean V
 1524–1543 : Louis Tissart
 1552 : Charles, Cardinal of Lorraine
 1564 : Henri III Clausse
 1576 : Pierre IV de Gondi
 1598–1622 : Henri IV Cardinal de Gondi
 1622–1654 : Jean VI François de Gondi
 1654–1675 : Jean François Paul de Gondi, Cardinal de Retz
 1675–1733 : Jean VII François Paul Lefebvre de Caumartin
 1733–1737 : Louis de Bourbon-Condé, Count of Clermont
 1737 : Pierre V Augustin Bernardin de Rosset de Fleury
 1789–1790 : Jean Georges Lefranc de Pompignan

Notes

Links

LA TOUR DE BUZAY at pornic.com

Cistercian monasteries in France
1130s establishments in France
1790 disestablishments in France
Former Christian monasteries in France
Monuments historiques of Pays de la Loire
Monasteries dissolved during the French Revolution
Destroyed Christian monasteries